Dana Ahmed Majid (born 1957) is an Iraqi Kurdish politician, A former high-ranking member of the Patriotic Union of Kurdistan and now a leading member of the Gorran Movement, he was the Governor of Sulaymaniah  and former head of Asayesh security forces of Iraq Kurdistan., Dana started his career as a Peshmerge & later became the PUK's representative to Tehran and Damascus. The Christian Science Monitor describes Dana as having an enigmatic smile.

References

Governors of Sulaymaniyah Governorate
Living people
1957 births
Gorran Movement politicians